The Hampton Pirates men's basketball team is the basketball team that represents Hampton University in Hampton, Virginia, United States. The Pirates compete in the Colonial Athletic Association. The school's team formerly competed in the Mid-Eastern Athletic Conference, and the Big South Conference. Notably, the 2000-01 Hampton team was one of ten 15 seeds ever to upset a 2 seed in the Round of 64 of an NCAA tournament, defeating Iowa State in the first round.

Postseason results

NCAA Division I tournament results
The Pirates have appeared in the NCAA Division I tournament six times. Their combined record is 2–6.

NIT results
The Pirates have appeared in the National Invitation Tournament (NIT) one time. Their record is 0–1.

CBI results
The Pirates have appeared in the College Basketball Invitational (CBI) two times. Their combined record is 0–2.

CIT results
The Pirates have appeared in the CollegeInsider.com Postseason Tournament (CIT), one time. Their record is 3–1.

NCAA Division II tournament results
The Pirates have appeared in the NCAA Division II tournament one time. Their record is 1–1.

NAIA tournament results
The Pirates have appeared in the NAIA tournament three times. Their combined record is 4–3.

Award winners

MEAC Player of the Year
Tarvis Williams (2001)
Tommy Adams (2002)

References

External links